Emine Sultan may refer to:
 Emine Sultan (daughter of Mustafa II) (1696–1739), Ottoman princess
 Emine Sultan (daughter of Abdülaziz) (1874–1920), Ottoman princess